Molla Ahmad Naraqi (1185-1245 A.H./1771-1829 C.E.) also known as known as “Fauzel Narauqee”, was a Shi'i cleric ("mullah"), who has been called "the first Shi‘i jurisprudent to argue  for wilayat al-faqıh al-siyasıyah, or "the divine mandate of the jurisprudent to rule" during the occultation of the Imam. The concept of wilayat al-faqıh or Velayat-e Faqıh (Guardianship of the Islamic Jurist) came to the attention of the world when Ayatollah Ruhollah Khomeini led the Islamic Iranian Revolution in 1978-9 and established the Islamic Republic of Iran using wilayat al-faqıh as its governing principal. Naraqi's work called for the system in his technical fiqh work entitled Awa’id al-ayyam 
predating the call by the Ayatollah Ruhollah Khomeini for this system in his lectures and book Islamic Government by more than a century.

Unlike Khomeini, Molla Naraqi never tried to establish or called for the establishment of a state based on wilayat al-faqıh al-siyasıyah.

Biography
Naraqi was born on the 14th of Jumada al-Thani, 1185 A.H. during the reign of Karim Khan Zand.  He was tutor by his father from the age of five until twenty. He received the title of mujtahid at the age of fifteen and traveled to Iraq with his father in order to continue the hawza studies "in the main center of Shia hawza where he was a student under Moḥammad Mahdī Baḥr al-ʿUlūm, Sayyed Ali Tabautabau’ee, Sayyed Mahdi Shahrestani, and Sheikh Mohammad Ja’far Najafee.  After his father Molla Mahdee died in 1209 A.H., Naraqi returned to Kashan to take over his father’s hawza in that region.

Naraqi lived during a time of Russian conquest of parts of Iran, from the Russo-Persian War of 1804–1813 and Russo-Persian War of 1826–1828 when some of the leading scholars (Sayyed Mohammad Mojauhed, Molla Ahmad, Sayyed Nasrollah Estar-aubaudee, Sayyed Mohammad Taqee Qazvinee) called on the Shah to raise an army to expel the Russians. While Iran was ultimately unsuccessful, the jihad was thought to be a "great display of the their national and religious pride."

How many sons Naraqi had is disputed. According to one source he had two sons who both of whom became scholars.  Hauj Molla Mohammad, became known as “Hojjat-ol-islam”, and received the title of “Khautam-ol-mojtahedeen”, and was the son-in-law of Mirza-ye-qomee.  Nasiroddeen also became a scholar.

Notes

References 

1771 births
1829 deaths
20th-century Iranian people
Iranian Shia clerics